Turris multigyrata is an extinct species of sea snail, a marine gastropod mollusk in the family Turridae, the turrids.

Description

Distribution
Fossils of this marine species were found in Eocene strata in the Paris Basin, France.

References

 Cossmann M. & Pissarro G. (1904-1913). Iconographie complète des coquilles fossiles de l'Eocène des environs de Paris. Tome 1, Pélécypodes: pls 1-16 [September 1904], pls 17-38 [January 1905], pls 39-45 and Table alphabétique des espèces [October 1906]. Tome 2, Scaphopodes, Gastropodes, Brachiopodes, Céphalopodes & Supplément: pls 1-9 [June 1907], pls 10-25 [March 1910], pls 26-45 [March 1911], pls 46-65, Errata, Table alphabétique des espèces and Addenda [October 1913]. Paris.
 H. L. Abbass. 1967. A monograph on the Egyptian Paleocene and Eocene gastropods. United Arab Republic, Geological Survey-Geological Museum, Palaeontological Series, Monograph (4)1-154 

multigyrata
Gastropods described in 1906